Seafield is an unincorporated community in Princeton Township, White County, in the U.S. state of Indiana.

History
Seafield was platted in 1863 as a station and shipping point on the railroad. A post office was established at Seafield in 1861, and remained in operation until 1939. The community derives its name from a merchant named Sea.

Geography

References

Unincorporated communities in White County, Indiana
Unincorporated communities in Indiana